is a beat 'em up arcade game that was developed and released by SNK for the Neo Geo Japanese arcade and home systems in 1992 while the English versions were released in 1992.

Gameplay 

One or two players (Player 1 as Ricky and Player 2 as Johnny) fight their way through the six levels of various mutated and mechanical enemies, each level containing one or more sub-bosses before an actual boss appears at the end of each stage. The game plays close to the usual beat 'em up mold allowing the player to utilize various combos, jumping attacks, throws and special moves to utilize on the opposition. Rather than the standard fare of allowing players to pick up objects to use as weapons against the enemy however, Mutation Nation instead uses a system where the player can pick up one of four elemental spheres that allow the player the ability to unleash screen-filling super attacks. There are also neutral spheres that will give life back to the player and increase the number of super attacks that they can use.

Spheres 
These are the various elemental spheres that can be picked up by the player and used for special attacks. Each sphere is represented by a letter and color that helps the player tell them apart. If the players do not have any spheres available, they can instead sacrifice part of their life meter to unleash a flurry of attacks.

Light - Yellow with the letter A written on it. The light sphere unleashes the fastest but also least damaging attack in the game. The player splits into two bodies of light that shoot out in opposite directions before coming back together to reform the body after the enemies have been knocked down.
Fire - This sphere is represented by the letter B and has a reddish color. It unleashes a large explosion from the player's hands which does heavy damage to everything on screen.
Lightning - The lightning sphere has a blue color and the letter C. The attack it produces is by far the slowest attack in the game. However, the player is invincible for the duration of the entire animation. The character will jump up off screen and come down a few moments later hitting the ground to create lightning bolts that go off in all directions for moderate damage.
Wind - The last sphere is green and has the letter D on it. It unleashes the most powerful attack in the game where the player turns into a massive green tornado that will travel back and forth over the screen, mowing down everything in its path and often hitting more than once for massive damage.

Plot 
In the year of 20XX, a mad scientist was shut down by his superiors after conducting bizarre biological experiments. However soon after, his lab exploded and the scientist himself mysteriously disappeared. Now several years later, there are new buildings on top of the forgotten slums where the experiments took place and suddenly a genetic virus has started to spread among the tenants turning them into vicious mutants. Two young men of the local city, Ricky Jones and Johnny Hart, return to town after having been away for a long time and upon seeing the chaos that's happening, they take it upon themselves to clean the town up before the mutants spread across the nation. Along the way they come across not just the mutants, but also robotic foes that the mad scientist has created to stop them.

Development and release

Reception 

RePlay reported Mutation Nation to be the fifth most-popular arcade game at the time. In Japan, Game Machine listed Mutation Nation on their May 1, 1992 issue as being the sixteenth most-popular arcade game at the time. The title received generally favourable reception from critics since its release in arcades and other platforms.

AllGames Kyle Knight regarded the sphere-based super-attack system as innovative but criticized issues with the controls, repetitive gameplay, enemy AI and average audiovisual presentation. Aktueller Software Markts Hans-Joachim Amann praised the visuals and large character sprites but criticized the sound design. Consoles + Marc Menier and Axel also commended the visual presentation, sprite animations, sound, playability and longevity. Computer and Video Games Frank O'Connor gave positive remarks to the audiovisual presentation as well, stating that its gameplay is good for beat 'em up standards but criticized the lack of originality. Electronic Gaming Monthlys four reviewers praised the graphics and sound but criticized the Neo Geo AES version for its use of unlimited continues. GamePros Slasher Quan commended the colorful visuals, background details, enemy variety and controls but criticized the lack of a throw move.

Hobby Consolas Marcos García gave positive remarks to the multiplayer, digitized sound and playability but noted the lack of additional moves for the main characters. Joypads Nourdine Nini and Joysticks Jean-Marc Demoly gave positive comments to its graphics, character animations, controls and sound. Nintendo Lifes Dave Frear praised the varied character designs and rock-style music. Player Ones Christophe Pottier stated that "Despite the beautiful scenery and animation characteristic of the Neo-Geo, Mutation Nation is a very average game compared to other beat 'em ups on the same console."

Notes

References

External links 
 Mutation Nation at GameFAQs
 Mutation Nation at Giant Bomb
 Mutation Nation at Killer List of Videogames
 Mutation Nation at MobyGames

1992 video games
ACA Neo Geo games
Arcade video games
SNK beat 'em ups
Multiplayer and single-player video games
Neo Geo games
Neo Geo CD games
Nintendo Switch games
PlayStation Network games
PlayStation 4 games
Science fiction video games
Side-scrolling beat 'em ups
Video games scored by Masahiko Hataya
Virtual Console games
Video games set in the 2050s
Windows games
Xbox One games
Video games developed in Japan
Hamster Corporation games